Acyrtops is a genus of clingfishes native to the western Atlantic Ocean.

Species
There are currently two recognized species in this genus:
 Acyrtops amplicirrus Briggs, 1955 (Flarenostril clingfish)
 Acyrtops beryllinus (Hildebrand & Ginsburg, 1927) (Emerald clingfish)

References

Gobiesocidae